Craig Ball is an American, swing clarinet player and leader of the White Heat Swing Orchestra. He recorded the sound track for the Warner Brother’s film Dick Tracy.

Ball has played in concert with Cab Calloway
Tony Bennett, Joel Grey, and Lou Rawls. His orchestra was named "Boston's Best Dance Band" by Boston Magazine. Norah Jones used to be a regular singer with his band.

Ball's White Heat Swing Orchestra was chosen to play at Governor Deval Patrick's Inaugural Ball on January 6, 2011.

References

Living people
Swing clarinetists
Swing bandleaders
Big band bandleaders
American jazz clarinetists
American jazz bandleaders
21st-century clarinetists
Year of birth missing (living people)